Modern Greece: A History Since 1821 is a book written by John S. Koliopoulos and Thanos Veremes. This book was first published on 1 January 2009.

Synopsis 
The book provides a chronological narrative of the social, political and economic history of modern Greece, beginning with the outbreak of the Greek War of Independence in 1821 until 2008. The book is divided into thirteen chapters.

References 

History books about Greece
2009 non-fiction books
History of modern Greece